Jeon Yeong-Eun (전영은,  or  ; born 24 May 1988 in Daejeon) is a South Korean race walker. She  competed in the 20 km kilometres event at the 2012 Summer Olympics and 2016 Summer Olympics. She also competed in the Women's 20 kilometres walk event at the 2015 World Championships in Athletics in Beijing, China, as well as the same event at the 2011 World Championships on home soil in Daegu, and the 2013 World Championships in Moscow.

References

External links 
 

1988 births
Living people
South Korean female racewalkers
Asian Games bronze medalists for South Korea
Asian Games medalists in athletics (track and field)
Athletes (track and field) at the 2010 Asian Games
Athletes (track and field) at the 2012 Summer Olympics
Athletes (track and field) at the 2014 Asian Games
Athletes (track and field) at the 2016 Summer Olympics
Athletes (track and field) at the 2018 Asian Games
Olympic athletes of South Korea
Sportspeople from Daejeon
World Athletics Championships athletes for South Korea
Medalists at the 2014 Asian Games
21st-century South Korean women